Christopher Wayne Toney (born February 13, 1988) is an American politician who has served as a Delegate from the 31st District to the West Virginia House of Delegates since 2018. He is a Republican.

Early life, education, and career
Toney was born to Gregory Toney and Emma Shrewsbury. He received a B.A. in History and Special Education from Concord University. He operated a school bus before assuming office.

Elections

2018
In his first primary, Toney defeated incumbent Chanda Adkins with 51.16% of the vote.

In the general election, Toney defeated Democrat Richard Snuffer with 55.76% of the vote to win his seat in the House of Delegates.

2020
In Toney's second primary election, he defeated fellow Republican Kase Poling with 56.60% of the vote.

In the general, Toney ran and won unopposed.

Tenure

Committee assignments
Veterans Affairs (Vice Chair)
Education
Finance
Senior, Children, and Family Issues
Small Business and Economic Development

Coal
Toney voted for $12 million worth of tax cuts and exemptions in order to bail out a failing coal plant.

Education
Toney was one of a few Republicans to oppose an omnibus education bill that would allow charter schools in West Virginia and increase school funding, among other things.

Additionally, Toney supported a bill to allow students in home-school to participate in public school sports, on the condition that they take certain virtual classes.

Federal term limits
Toney sponsored a resolution supporting a Constitutional convention to consider term limits for members of Congress. A similar resolution was adopted by both houses of the legislature in 2021. Many more states would have to ratify similar resolutions for a convention to be held.

Gun control
As of 2020, Toney had a 92% rating from the National Rifle Association and a 64% rating from the West Virginia Citizen's Defense League, a local gun rights organization.

Toney supported a bill to allow concealed carry on college campuses. The bill was ultimately stalled in the State Senate by protest and debate.

Labor
Toney has a 44% rating from the AFL–CIO as of 2020. He voted against a bill that would make it more difficult for employees to strike.

Marijuana
Toney opposed efforts to legalize marijuana in West Virginia and efforts to expand access to medical marijuana.

West Virginia Impact Fund
Toney sponsored a bipartisan bill to create a fund to invest in and attract businesses to West Virginia in order to create jobs. Additionally, Toney wrote an op-ed praising the legislation. The bill was signed by West Virginia Governor Jim Justice in March 2020.

Personal life
Toney is a Christian.

References

1988 births
Living people
Republican Party members of the West Virginia House of Delegates
21st-century American politicians
Concord University alumni